The men's trap was a shooting sports event held as part of the Shooting at the 1960 Summer Olympics programme. It was the eighth appearance of the event. The competition was held from 5 to 9 September 1960 at the shooting ranges in Rome. 66 shooters from 38 nations competed. Each nation could send up to two shooters. The event was won by Ion Dumitrescu of Romania, the nation's first medal in the men's trap. The defending champion, Galliano Rossini of Italy, took silver this time to become the first person to earn multiple medals in the trap competition. Soviet shooter Sergei Kalinin received bronze.

Background

This was the eighth appearance of the men's ISSF Olympic trap event. The event was held at every Summer Olympics from 1896 to 1924 (except 1904, when no shooting events were held) and from 1952 to 2016. As with most shooting events, it was nominally open to women from 1968 to 1980; the trap remained open to women through 1992. Very few women participated these years. The event returned to being men-only for 1996, though the new double trap had separate events for men and women that year. In 2000, a separate women's event was added and it has been contested at every Games since. There was also a men's team trap event held four times from 1908 to 1924.

Three of the top 10 shooters from the 1956 Games returned: gold medalist Galliano Rossini of Italy, silver medalist Adam Smelczyński of Poland, and fifth-place finisher Yury Nikandrov of the Soviet Union. Since winning the Olympic gold in 1956, Rossini had reached the podium at both of the intervening World Championships: silver in 1958 and bronze in 1959. His teammate in Rome, Edoardo Casciano, had also taken medals at both Worlds (bronze in 1958, silver in 1959). The reigning World Champion, Hussam El-Badrawi of Egypt (now competing for the United Arab Republic) was also competing in 1960.

Chile, the Republic of China, India, Lebanon, Luxembourg, Malta, Peru, Portugal, San Marino, South Africa, South Korea, the United Arab Republic, and Zimbabwe each made their debut in the event; East and West Germany competed together as the United Team of Germany for the first time. Great Britain made its eighth appearance, the only nation to have competed at each edition of the event to that point.

Competition format

The competition used the 200-target format introduced with the return of trap to the Olympics in 1952. The 1960 event, with a much larger field than in 1952 and 1956, added a 100-target preliminary round. The top 36 shooters advanced from the 100-target preliminary round to shoot the 200-target final round. The qualification round was shot in 2 series of 50 shots; the final round was shot in 8 series of 25 shots. Scores were reset between rounds (only the final round counted for those qualifying).

Records

Prior to this competition, the existing world and Olympic records were as follows. 

No new world or Olympic records were set during the competition.

Schedule

Results

Andersson and Nikandrov had the best scores of the qualifying round, hitting 97 of 100 targets. The cut-off for the final round turned out to be 85 hits. Scores of those shooters not advancing are not known.

The Soviets, Kalinin and Nikandrov, hit all 25 targets in the first series of the final. Kalinin kept up the pace, perfect in the 2nd and 4th series as well on his way to a 99 of 100 score to lead the first half. Rossini, the defending champion, was close behind at 98. The second half of the final did not go as well for the leaders, with Rossini hitting only 93 (191 total) and Kalinin 91 (190 total). Those scores were enough to keep them on the podium, however, though not enough to win: Dumitrescu's 98 in the second half put him over the top at 192 total.

References

Shooting at the 1960 Summer Olympics
Trap at the Olympics